Glomel is a commune in the Côtes-d'Armor department in Brittany in northwestern France.

Population

Inhabitants of Glomel are called glomelois in French.

Geography

Glomel is located on the northern slope of the Montagnes Noires (french, Black Mountains). The Minez Du is the highest peak in the village.

Map

Breton language
In 2008, 25.47% of primary school children attended bilingual schools.

Gallery

Churches

Civil heritage

See also
Communes of the Côtes-d'Armor department

References

External links

Communes of Côtes-d'Armor